Bolshoy Zyudostinskiy is a large island in the Caspian Sea. It is located off the mouths of the Volga in an area where there are numerous delta islands.

Geography

Bolshoy Zyudostinskiy is separated from the coast to its north by a broad channel.

Administratively, Bolshoy Zyudostinskiy belongs to the Astrakhan Oblast of the Russian Federation.

Nearby islands

References

External links
Legal Regime of the Artificial Islands in the Caspian Sea

Islands of Astrakhan Oblast
Islands of the Caspian Sea